The men's 110 metres hurdles event at the 2016 African Championships in Athletics was held on 24 and 25 June in Kings Park Stadium.

Medalists

Results

Heats
Qualification: First 3 of each heat (Q) and the next 2 fastest (q) qualified for the final.

Wind:Heat 1: +1.8 m/s, Heat 2: +1.3 m/s

Final
Wind: No information

References

2016 African Championships in Athletics
Sprint hurdles at the African Championships in Athletics